Guraleus dubius is an extinct species of sea snail, a marine gastropod mollusk in the family Mangeliidae.

Description

Distribution
This marine species occurs as a fossil in Middle to Late Eocene strata of New Zealand

References

 Maxwell, P.A. (2009). Cenozoic Mollusca. Pp 232–254 in Gordon, D.P. (ed.) New Zealand inventory of biodiversity. Volume one. Kingdom Animalia: Radiata, Lophotrochozoa, Deuterostomia. Canterbury University Press, Christchurch

External links
 National Paleontological Collection Database: Guraleus dubius

dubius
Gastropods described in 1992
Gastropods of New Zealand